"Don't Let Me Fall" is a song by American recording artist B.o.B, released in the US on April 5, 2010 as the second single from his debut studio album, B.o.B Presents: The Adventures of Bobby Ray (2010). The track was released as a digital download on April 5, and was later released as a "Deluxe Single", on November 30, 2010 through Atlantic Records. The song was sent to radio on September 28, 2010. The song was featured on the fourth season premiere of The Game on BET and was also used during the intro for the 2011 BCS National Championship Game on ESPN.

Music video
The music video, directed by Ethan Lander, who also directed "Nothin' on You," was filmed in downtown Denver at Red Rocks Park and Amphitheatre. The video contains footage from B.o.B's humble beginnings and of supporters, from manager TJ Chapman to Grand Hustle label-boss T.I. The video premiered at midnight November 16, 2010 on MTV.com.

Track listing
 iTunes released "Don't Let Me Fall" as a deluxe single on November 30, 2010.

 Digital single

Personnel
Lead vocals – Bobby Simmons
Producers – Bobby Simmons and Chris Moten
Lyrics – Bobby Simmons, Clarence Montgomery III
Label: Grand Hustle, Rebel Rock, Atlantic

Charts and certifications

Charts

Certifications

References

2010 songs
B.o.B songs
Songs written by B.o.B
Song recordings produced by B.o.B
Grand Hustle Records singles
Contemporary R&B ballads
Pop ballads
2010 singles
Alternative hip hop songs